Ugoyan is a rural locality (a selo) in Belletsky Rural Okrug of Aldansky District in the Sakha Republic, Russia, located  from Aldan, the administrative center of the district, and  from Khatystyr, the administrative center of the rural okrug. Its population as of the 2010 Census was 375; down from 308 recorded in the 2002 Census.

References

Notes

Sources
Official website of the Sakha Republic. Registry of the Administrative-Territorial Divisions of the Sakha Republic. Aldansky District. 

Rural localities in Aldansky District